The 2017–18 FC Midtjylland season was FC Midtjylland's 19th season of existence, and their 17th consecutive season in the Danish Superliga, the top tier of football in Denmark. Outside of the Superliga, Midtjylland competed in the Danish Cup and the UEFA Europa League qualifying rounds.

The 2017–18 campaign saw Midtjylland win their second Danish Superliga title, and their first since 2015. The club also reached the semifinals of the 2017–18 Danish Cup, and the play-off round of the 2017–18 UEFA Europa League.

Background

Squad

Non-competitive

Preseason exhibitions

Mid-season exhibitions

Competitive

Danish Superliga

League table

Danish Cup

UEFA Europa League

First qualifying round

Second qualifying round

Third qualifying round

Play-off round

Statistics

Top goalscorers

References

External links 
FC Midtjylland in Danish

FC Midtjylland seasons
Danish football clubs 2017–18 season